Juan Kemp Airport,  is an airstrip on the southern shore of Rupanco Lake in the  Los Lagos Region of Chile.

There is nearby mountainous terrain south of the runway. Terrain is a consideration for southwest approach and departure.

See also

Transport in Chile
List of airports in Chile

References

External links
OpenStreetMap - Juan Kemp
OurAirports - Juan Kemp
FallingRain - Juan Kemp Airport

Airports in Los Lagos Region